Tamu Township  is a township in Tamu District in the Sagaing Division of Burma. The principal town is Tamu. The only township of Tamu District, the township borders India.

References

External links
Maplandia World Gazetteer - map showing the township boundary

Townships of Sagaing Region